Tung Wah Group of Hospitals Kap Yan Directors' College is a Hong Kong secondary school. Situated in Choi Yuen Estate, Sheung Shui, New Territories near Sheung Shui station, the grammar school is fully subsidized by Government of Hong Kong. The school adopts English as the medium of instruction (EMI). Established in 1982 and governed by Tung Wah Group of Hospitals, the oldest and largest charitable organization in Hong Kong, the school is the eleventh secondary school established by the organization.

See also 
 Tung Wah Group of Hospitals
 Education in Hong Kong
 List of secondary schools in Hong Kong
 List of schools in Hong Kong

References

External links 

 Tung Wah Group of Hospitals Kap Yan Directors' College
 Tung Wah Group of Hospitals
 School Profile

Sheung Shui
Tung Wah Group of Hospitals
Tung Wah Group of Hospitals (Education)
Secondary schools in Hong Kong